Chengdu Meishi International School is a school in Chengdu, China. Opened in 2002, the school offers American and Chinese curricula as well as the IB Diploma Programme. Located outside of the 3rd ring road south of Chengdu, the school is an authorized education provider for the U.S. State Department, Indian and French employees.

History
In fall 2000, a Chinese coupleYang De-ming and Grace Chen Qi, a Chinese couple who had spent many years living in the United States, returned to China to invest in and found Chengdu Meishi International School. With the backing of Meishi Group and the Chinese government, and after nearly two years of planning, a campus with a blend of the East and the West's architectural styles  was opened. The school began classes on September 1st, 2002. 

The school is accredited by the North Central Association of Colleges and Schools.

Campus
The school has separate buildings for its Chinese and International divisions. 

The campus contains a soccer field, a badminton court, a basketball court, a sports center with a variety of sporting equipment, and dorms. The library is shared by the domestic and foreign divisions.

Curriculum
Chengdu Meishi International School offers students choices of an American curriculum, Chinese curriculum, French national program, IB Diploma, and Advanced Placement (AP) Diploma for both Chinese and foreign students.

Extracurricular activities
Meishi offers a wide range of extracurricular activities that are tailored to the needs of Chinese students. Meishi also fields basketball and soccer teams that take on rival international schools. An annual poetry slam and spelling bee are also held at the elementary school. Each quarter's IB CAS curriculum is arranged with a new set of activities.

Student life
Meishi International school is divided into two sections: the Chinese division, where instruction is conducted entirely in Chinese, and the International division, where instruction is conducted entirely in English, even though the majority of the students are Chinese. The Chinese Division is the most popular, with thousands of students attending. The International division only has 200 students, almost all Chinese.

External links

International schools in Chengdu
Educational institutions established in 2002
International Baccalaureate schools in China
2002 establishments in China